Plumpton Racecourse is a National Hunt racecourse in the village of Plumpton, East Sussex near Lewes and Brighton.  Racing first took place at Plumpton in 1884.

Its most notable race is the Sussex National Handicap Chase

History
Plumpton Racecourse opened in 1884, however the very first events at the course took place in 1876 with Thomas Henry Case undertaking hare coursing. In 1961, Isidore Kerman bought the course and significantly improved the facilities, with the Southdown Stand opening in 1987 under his stewardship.  The Queen Mother had her first winner at Plumpton with Super Fox in 1963. In 1998, the course was sold to Adrian Pratt and Peter Savill who continue to operate Plumpton Racecourse today.

Several notable charity races have taken place at Plumpton.  In March 1980, HRH The Prince of Wales finished second to television presenter, Derek Thompson, in the Mad Hatters private sweepstake. He rode favourite Long Wharf. In October 2001, television presenters Alice Plunkett and Alex Hammond finish 1st and 2nd in a charity race.

In 2005, Voy Por Ustedes won the Coral Casino Handicap Chase on his way to winning the Arkle Challenge Trophy at the Cheltenham Festival.

On 9 February 2009 AP McCoy won his 3,000th race at Plumpton.

The course 
Plumpton is a tight, undulating, left-handed course that features only National Hunt racing.  There are 7 fences.  Both the hurdle course and chase course feature the same, uphill run in to the winners post.

References

Horse racing venues in England
Sports venues in East Sussex
Sports venues completed in 1884
Racecourse